The 1970 BC Lions finished in fourth place in the Western Conference with a 6–10 record and failed to make the playoffs.  New coach Jackie Parker had led the team to a 4-2 record in the final 6 games of 1969 after taking over for Jim Champion and there was reason for optimism after a 5-3 start to 1970.  However, the wheels fell off in the fall as the Lions won only 1 game in the second half of the season.

Before the season, Empire Stadium became the first facility in Canada to have artificial playing surface installed, made by 3M, under the brand name "Tartan Turf".

Running back Jim Evenson had his third consecutive 1,000-yard season with 1003 yards in an injury-shortened 14 games and receiver Jim Young had 1041 yards receiving. The big offseason addition of Ottawa star Vic Washington was a bust as he played only 9 games and was openly disgruntled for most of season.

For the first time in five seasons, the Lions had CFL All-stars as Evenson, guard Ken Sugarman and linebacker Greg Findlay were all league all-stars.
Young won the CFL's Most Outstanding Canadian Award.

The Lions introduced a new jersey which featured orange "ti-cat" stripes down the arms of home and away jerseys.  As well, the Lions went to grey pants which they would wear for the next eight seasons.

After the season, Jackie Parker was promoted to general manager and he hired Eagle Keys away from Saskatchewan to become head coach of the Lions for the 1971 season.

Offseason

CFL Draft

Preseason

Regular season

Season standings

Season schedule

Offensive leaders

Awards and records
CFL's Most Outstanding Canadian Award – Jim Young (WR)

1970 CFL All-Stars
RB – Jim Evenson, CFL All-Star
OG – Ken Sugerman, CFL All-Star
LB – Greg Findlay, CFL All-Star

References

BC Lions seasons
1970 Canadian Football League season by team
1970 in British Columbia